Jacques Schiffrin (March 28, 1892, Baku – November 17, 1950, New York City) was an editor and French translator, famous for the creation of Bibliothèque de la Pléiade in 1923 and was integrated with Gallimard in 1933.

Biography
Jacques Schiffrin came from a non-practicing Jewish family in Baku. Graduated in law from the Faculty of Geneva, he moved to Paris in 1922 after the Russian Revolution of 1917 which made him flee to Monte-Carlo.

Editor
Passionate about literature, he created in Paris the editions of the Pléiade / J. Schiffrin & Co. in 1923, located at 6 rue Tournefort. In November 1925, he founded with Joseph Poutermann, his brother-in-law, and Alexandre Halpern, the Société des Amis de la Pléiade. In 1931, he launched a luxury edition of the great French and foreign authors, the “Linked Library of the Pléiade” in which appeared a dozen volumes including the works of Baudelaire, Racine, Voltaire, Edgar Allan Poe, Laclos, Musset and Stendhal.

He befriended many great writers of this period and especially with Andre Gide, with whom he made the translation of news of Pushkin, and where he became a close friend with whom he talks a very important match for 30 years. It was André Gide who pushed Gaston Gallimard, owner of the NRF editions, to integrate the Pléiade Library into the Gallimard editions, something that will be carried out on July 31, 1933. Schiffrin then becomes the first director of this collection.

Naturalized French in 1937, Schiffrin was mobilized in 1939 into the French army.

The November 5, 1940, following anti-Jewish laws, he was suddenly dismissed by Gaston Gallimard and went to take refuge in the United States with his family in 1941, via Marseille, Casablanca and Lisbon with the financial assistance of André Gide.

He moved to New York to continue his publishing profession by founding the Pantheon Books editions with the German publisher couple Helen and Kurt Wolff. He never returned to France and died in New York from a respiratory illness.

The translator
Jacques Schiffrin translated Russian authors (Tourgueniev, Pouchkine, Gogol, Dostoïevski) into French, which were published in 1929 by his first publishing house, and, after the war, by the French Book Club.

Personal life
Jacques Schiffrin is the brother of film producer Simon Schiffrin.

He was married, from 1921 to 1927, to the French pianist Youra Guller, before her departure for Shanghai. He remarried Simone Heymann with whom he had two children, including André Schiffrin born in 1935.

References 

French book publishers (people)
1892 births
1950 deaths
Azerbaijani Jews
French people of Azerbaijani descent
People from Baku
Soviet emigrants to France